This is a list of garlic dishes, comprising dishes and foods that use garlic as a main ingredient. Garlic is a species in the onion genus, Allium. Its close relatives include the onion, shallot, leek, chive, and Chinese onion. Garlic is native to Central Asia and northeastern Iran, has a history of several thousand years of human consumption and use, and has long been used as a seasoning worldwide. It was known to Ancient Egyptians, and has been used both as a food flavoring and as a traditional medicine.

Garlic dishes
 
 Agliata – a savory and pungent garlic sauce and condiment in Italian cuisine used to flavor and accompany broiled or boiled meats, fish and vegetables.
 Aioli – a Mediterranean sauce made of garlic and olive oil; in some regions other emulsifiers such as egg are used.
 Bagna càuda – a dish from Piedmont, Italy made of garlic, anchovies, olive oil and butter, it is served and consumed in a manner similar to fondue.
 Česnečka – a garlic soup in Czech cuisine and Slovak cuisine consisting of a thin broth, a significant amount of garlic, sliced potatoes and spices such as caraway, marjoram and cumin. 
 Garlic bread 
 Garlic butter 
 Garlic chutney – prepared using fresh garlic, dry or fresh coconut, groundnuts and green or red chili peppers, additional ingredients are also sometimes used.
 Garlic fingers – an Atlantic Canadian dish similar in shape and size to a pizza and made with the same type of dough, instead of being cut in triangular slices, they are presented in thin strips, or "fingers".
 Garlic ice cream – has been a dish at many garlic festivals
 Garlic oil
Garlic rice – a Filipino fried rice dish made from stir-frying garlic and stale leftover cooked rice, and seasoned with salt.
 Garlic sauce – typically a pungent sauce, with the depth of garlic flavor determined by the amount of garlic used
 Garlic sausage – prepared using garlic and pork or beef/veal, or a combination of pork and beef.
 Garlic soup – many versions exist worldwide
 Ginger garlic masala – a crushed mixture of raw ginger and garlic cloves
 Garlic vinegar
 Honey garlic sauce
 Laba garlic – a vinegar-preserved garlic with a refined green coloration and a sour and slightly spicy flavor, its name derives from typically being prepared on December 8 of the lunar calendar (lunar month December the eighth, the Laba Festival, a traditional Chinese holiday).
 Mujdei – a spicy Romanian sauce made from garlic cloves crushed and ground into a paste, salted and mixed energetically with water and vegetable oil.
 Persillade – a sauce or seasoning mixture of parsley chopped together with seasonings including garlic, herbs, oil, and vinegar.
 Pistou – a Provençal cold sauce made from cloves of garlic, fresh basil, and olive oil. It is somewhat similar to the Ligurian sauce pesto, although it lacks pine nuts.
 Skordalia –  a thick puree in Greek cuisine made by combining crushed garlic with a bulky base, such as a purée of potatoes, walnuts, almonds or liquid-soaked stale bread, and then beating the mixture in olive oil to make a smooth emulsion. Vinegar is often added.
 Smoked garlic
 Toum – a garlic sauce common to the Levant, it is similar to Provençal aioli, and contains garlic, salt, olive oil or vegetable oil, and lemon juice. It is traditionally crushed together using a wooden mortar and pestle.
 Vanillerostbraten – an Austrian beef cutlet dish prepared with garlic, salt, pepper, butter, onions, and brown bouillon and normally served with fried potatoes

Gallery

See also

 List of onion dishes
 Pyruvate scale

References

 
Lists of foods by type
Lists of foods by ingredient